The Queen's Award for Enterprise: International Trade (Export) (2006) was awarded on 21 April 2006, by Queen Elizabeth II.

Recipients
The following organisations were awarded this year.

 20 Essex Street of London WC2 for legal services
 Abbey Masterbatch Ltd of Ashton-under-Lyne, for Masterbatch and pigment dispersions.
 Aerotron Limited of Crawley, West Sussex for aircraft component parts and services.
 Aircom International Limited of Redhill, Surrey for telecom software consultancy and training.
 Albourne Partners Limited of London SW8 for advice to investors in hedge funds.
 Allam Marine Limited of Hull for Industrial and marine generators, controls and switchgear
 Aura Corporation UK Ltd of Beaconsfield, for market research services and channel marketing.
 Baillie Gifford Overseas Limited of Edinburgh, Scotland for investment management.
 Capital Valves Ltd of Wembley, Middlesex for valves and ancillary equipment to the oil, petro-chemical and chemical industries.
 Ceramicoat Tunnel Linings and Coatings Ltd of Taunton, Somerset for protective coating systems for tunnels.
 The Change Group International Plc of London W1 for foreign currency services.
 Colchester Global Investors Limited of London W1 for investment management.
 ColorMatrix Europe Ltd of Knowsley, Merseyside for liquid colourants and additives for the plastics industry.
 Conseco International Ltd of London W1 for multidisciplinary technical consultancy services for projects in infrastructure and the built environment.
 Corus Special Profiles of Saltburn-by-the-Sea for special shaped steel profiles.
 Craig Group Limited of Aberdeen, Scotland for global shipowners energy services, oilfield support vessels, procurement, catering, subsea survey and mooring equipment.
 John Crane UK Ltd., Turbomachinery Division of Slough, Berkshire for gas lubricated mechanical seals and related products and services.
 DSG international plc of Hemel Hempstead, for electrical appliances.
 Dage Precision Industries Ltd of Aylesbury, Buckinghamshire for test and inspection systems.
 Data Connection Ltd of Enfield, Middlesex for communications and telephony systems including protocol stacks, unified messaging, conferencing and VoIP Class 5 switch
 Jeffrey Davies and Davies Limited of Dunton Green, Sevenoaks, for pork, poultry, lamb and other meat products.
 Diagnostic Monitoring Systems Ltd of Glasgow, Scotland for UHF partial discharge monitoring systems.
 Diamond Consulting Services Ltd of Aylesbury, Buckinghamshire for patented software for vehicle detection and classification.
 Dorset Cereals of Dorchester, Dorset for breakfast cereals.
 Dyson James Ltd of Malmesbury, Wiltshire for vacuum cleaners.
 The European Lawyer Limited of London W1 for a legal magazine and comparative business law text books.
 FT Technologies Ltd of Teddington, Middlesex for wind and airflow sensors, featuring patented acoustic resonance technology
 Falmouth Fishselling Company Limited (Falfish) of Redruth, Cornwall for fresh and frozen fish and shellfish
 Fastalloys Ltd of Bradford, West Yorkshire for superalloy/stainless steel sheet and strip.
 FilmLight Ltd of London W1 for digital film equipment for the motion picture industry.
 Fintec Crushing & Screening Ltd of Ballygawley, Dungannon, County Tyrone for mobile crushing and screening equipment plus mobile concrete block machines
 Firmdale Hotels PLC of London SW7 for hotel services.
 Forest Press Hydraulics Ltd of Cinderford, Gloucestershire for concrete pressing machinery.
 John Foster of England Limited of Bradford, West Yorkshire for worsted and natural fibre fabrics.
 Gooch & Housego PLC of Ilminster, Somerset for acousto-optic devices and precision optics.
 Goodwin Steel Castings Ltd of Hanley, Stoke-on-Trent, Staffordshire for machined and fabricated alloy and super alloy steel castings and assemblies
 Graff Diamonds International Limited of London W1 for diamond and gem set jewellery.
 Grafton Recruitment International Plc of Belfast, Northern Ireland for recruitment agency.
 Grant Macdonald (Silversmiths) Limited of London SE1 for ornamental gold and silverwork.
 Guidance Navigation Limited of Leicester for navigation sensor systems for automatic vessel control.
 James Halstead plc of Radcliffe, Greater Manchester for commercial vinyl floor coverings.
 Peter Hambro Mining Plc of London SW1 for gold mining and exploration.
 Hatsu Marine Limited of London NW1 for container shipping services.
 The Henley Management College of Henley-on-Thames, for management education.
 Hughes Safety Showers Ltd of Bredbury, Stockport, for emergency safety showers, eyebaths and decontamination showers.
 IDTechEx Ltd of Swaffham Bulbeck, Cambridge for consultancy services.
 Immunodiagnostic Systems Limited of Boldon, Tyne and Wear for medical diagnostic test kits.
 IX Europe Plc of London W14 for datacentre services.
 JCB Earthmovers Ltd of Cheadle, Stoke-on-Trent for wheeled loading shovels and articulated dump trucks.
 JCB Heavy Products Ltd of Uttoxeter, Staffordshire for tracked and wheeled excavators.
 Keymat Technology Ltd (t/a STORM Interface) of West Drayton, Middlesex for robust data entry devices for installation on unattended public use terminals
 KeyMed (Medical & Industrial Equipment) of Southend-on-Sea, Essex for specialised medical and industrial equipment.
 Langtec Limited of Accrington, Lancashire for insulating products in tubular form.
 Law Business Research Ltd of London W11 for books, websites and magazines on international corporate law and legal services.
 John Lawrie (Aberdeen) Ltd of Altens, Aberdeen, for metal recycling and trading in steel tubulars.
 London College of Accountancy of London SE1 for professional accountancy, undergraduate and postgraduate accountancy, business and management education.
 Malvern Instruments Limited of Malvern, Worcestershire for instruments for particle characterization and rheological testing.
 Melett Limited of Dewsbury, West Yorkshire for turbocharger repair kits and parts for the turbo reconditioning industry.
 Meritmill Ltd of Batley, West Yorkshire for fabric pattern books and shade cards.
 Micron Sprayers Limited of Bromyard, Herefordshire for agricultural spraying equipment.
 Mondrian Investment Partners Limited of London EC2 for investment management.
 Orange Music Electronic Company Limited of Borehamwood, Hertfordshire for musical instrument amplifiers and speaker enclosures.
 Oxford Diffraction Ltd of Abingdon, Oxfordshire for x-ray diffraction equipment.
 Penta Consulting Limited of Wallington, Surrey for information and communication technology recruitment solutions.
 Phosyn plc of Pocklington, York for plant nutrient products.
 Photonic Products Limited of Bishop’s Stortford, for laser diodes and opto-electronic sub-assemblies.
 Playtop Limited of Newark, Nottinghamshire for playground safety surfaces.
 Polymeters Response International Ltd of Winchester, Hampshire for smart electricity meters, payment solutions and energy management systems.
 RFI Global Services Limited of Basingstoke, Hampshire for conformance testing and consultancy services to cellular, wireless, smartcard and electronics industries.
 RJH Trading Ltd of London SW1 for nonferrous metals, scrap, minor metals, ferroalloys, plastics and paper trading.
 Radnor Hills Mineral Water Co. Ltd of Knighton, Powys, Wales for mineral waters and soft drinks.
 John Reid & Sons (Strucsteel) Ltd of Christchurch, Dorset for steel structures for industrial buildings, aircraft hangars, grandstands and multi-storey car parks etc..
 SRK Consulting (UK) Limited of Cardiff, Wales for consulting services to the minerals industry.
 Sangenic International Limited of Cramlington, for nappy disposal system.
 Shape Technology Limited of Christchurch, Dorset for shape and profile measurement equipment and associated products.
 Sondex plc of Yateley, Hampshire for drilling and wireline logging equipment for oil and gas wells.
 Spectrum Technologies Plc of Bridgend, Mid Glamorgan, for laser wire marking systems.
 St Peter's Brewery Co Ltd of Bungay, Suffolk for beers and ales.
 Star Syringe Ltd of Uckfield, East Sussex Licensing the manufacture of the k1 auto-disable syringe.
 StatPro Group plc of London SW19 Financial software and related services
 TRB Limited of St Asaph, Denbighshire for automotive components.
 Wales TRP Sealing Systems Ltd of Hereford for elastomeric gaskets.
 Thermacore Europe Ltd of Ashington, Northumberland for electronics cooling solutions for the telecom, military, medical, computer and industrial markets.
 The University of Nottingham for higher educational and research services
 Victrex Plc of Thornton-Cleveleys, for high performance engineering thermoplastics.
 Wagtech International Ltd of Thatcham, Berkshire for environmental testing equipment.
 Walker Filtration Ltd of Washington, Tyne and Wear for compressed air and gas, vacuum and medical filtration equipment.
 William Data Systems Ltd of East Grinstead, West Sussex for software products.
 F G Wilson (Engineering) Ltd of Larne, County Antrim, for diesel and gas powered electricity generating sets.
 Wogen Titanium Ltd of London SW1 for titanium sponge.

References

Queen's Award for Enterprise: International Trade (Export)
2006 in the United Kingdom